Gastrogmus ischialis is a species of beetle in the family Carabidae, the only species in the genus Gastrogmus.

References

Pterostichinae